Anitha Kuppusamy is a Tamil folk and Carnatic singer, and television host known for her 'Naatupura Pattu', a Tamil folk art. Anitha aspired to become a singer from a young age. Apart from singing, Anitha has appeared as a judge on several television reality shows. Anitha has written few books on cookery and appeared in cookery shows on TV.

Biography 
Anitha was born in Mettupalayam. She was interested in music and singing from her childhood and managed to convince her family to pursue her career as singer. She gained B.A. in music at Avinashi Lingam College, Coimbatore. Anitha joined the University of Madras, Chennai and obtained M.A in Carnatic music.

She met Pushpavanam Kuppusamy, a fellow student at University of Madras, and they started singing together in various competitions and concerts. Eventually the couple got married. She learnt "Nattupura Pattu", a Tamil folk art, from her husband Pushpavanam Kuppusamy.

Career 
Anitha's main focus was on "Nattupura Pattu", a Tamil folk art. Along with her husband Pushpavanam Kuppusamy she has performed around 3,000 concerts in India and overseas.

Anitha incorporated social messages in her singing to create awareness specially about AIDS, dowry, smoking, drinking, female infanticide, child labour, importance of education for girls, and breast feeding.

Earlier Anitha's aim was to become a mainstream playback singer. But due to her frequent traveling for concerts she could not concentrate on playback singing.

Works

Folk albums 
 Mannu Manakkadhu
 Mann Vaasam
 Mann Osai
 Karisal Mann
 Solam Vedhaikkayile
 Meham Karukkudhadi
 Kalathu Medu
 Urkkuruvi
 Gramathu Geetham
 Kattumall
 Adiyathi Dance Dance
 Othaiyadippadhaiyile
 Thanjavooru Manneduthu
 Nattuppura Manam

Filmography

As Playback singer

Personal life 
Anitha is married to Pushpavanam Kuppusamy who is also a singer. She joined the All India Anna Dravida Munnetra Kazhagam political party in September 2013.

References 

Living people
Indian women classical singers
Indian women playback singers
Tamil playback singers
Tamil singers
Women Carnatic singers
Carnatic singers
Singers from Tamil Nadu
20th-century Indian singers
21st-century Indian singers
Tamil folk singers
Indian women folk singers
Indian folk singers
Year of birth missing (living people)
20th-century Indian women singers
Singers from Bangalore
Women musicians from Karnataka
21st-century Indian women singers
Film musicians from Karnataka
Women musicians from Tamil Nadu
People from Coimbatore district